When You Found Me is the eleventh studio album by American country-rock band Lucero. It was released on January 29, 2021, through Liberty & Lament and Thirty Tigers.

Background
The album was recorded in the summer of 2020 at Phillips Recording in Memphis, Tennessee, with producer Matt Ross-Spang.

Critical reception
When You Found Me was met with "generally favorable" reviews from critics. At Metacritic, which assigns a weighted average rating out of 100 to reviews from mainstream publications, this release received an average score of 75 based on 5 reviews.

Writing for AllMusic, Mark Deming wrote: "Nearly all the songs on When You Found Me trade in uncertainty and doubt, in human relationships that could seemingly fall apart at any moment, and the dramatic tension in Ben Nichols' vocals fits the slow-burning fuse of the music like bourbon and Coca-Cola. Lucero don't make the edgy doubt of these songs sound comfortable, but they do make them sound vivid and real." At Glide Magazine, John Moore said: "The band’s moody, at times Southern Gothic sound, is still tightly wrapped around the songs here, but there is also a feeling of nostalgia. Musically, the band is stripped down more so than they have been in a while on When You Found Me. And despite the pared down horn section, they used vintage synthesizers on certain songs, a first for the band, and managed to find some space for fiddles here and there." Essi Berelian of Classic Rock explained: "When You Found Me combines top-notch musicianship and expert songcraft with bags of brooding atmosphere, with Lucero clearly at the top of their southern-rocking game."

Track listing

Personnel
Credits adapted from AllMusic.

Band Members
 Ben Nichols – lead vocals, guitar
 John C. Stubblefield – bass
 Brian Venable – guitar
 Roy Berry − drums
 Rick Steff – piano

Other musicians
 Jim Spake – saxophone

Production
 Matt Ross-Spang, engineer, mixing, producer
 Pete Lyman – mastering
 Jeff Powell – mastering
 Matthew Cole – design

References

External links

 

2021 albums
Lucero (band) albums
Thirty Tigers albums